Tann is a village in the municipality of Dürnten in the district of Hinwil in the canton of Zurich, Switzerland.

Geography 

Tann is located in the Zürcher Oberland, in the south of Dürnten, and is geographically part of the southern municipality of Rüti. Jona river is flowing through the eastern Joweid and Tannertobel, a small river valley.

Demographics 
Tann belongs politically to the municipality of Dürnten and is its biggest village: 47% of 6,402 inhabitants are living in Tann (as of 2007). Four of a total of five school houses are located in Tann: Blatt, Tannenbühl, Bogenacker, and Nauen (high school level). With the neighbouring municipality of Rüti, Tann shares a wide variety of administrative structures among them the Roman Catholic Church community and electric power administration. In Tann is also the Reformed Methodist Church of Rüti-Wald-Hombrechtikon located.

Transportation 
Tann-Dürnten railway station, in the village, is a stop on the Zurich S-Bahn service S26 (Tösstalbahn) between Winterthur and Rüti respectively Rapperswil. The train station had been built in 1930. The bus line operator Verkehrsbetriebe Zürichsee und Oberland (VZO) provides its services for the regions of the Oberland and the upper northeastern Lake Zurich shore.

References

External links 

 Official website of the municipality of Dürnten 
 Official website of the municipality of Rüti 
 Roman catholic church of Tann 

Villages in the canton of Zürich
Dürnten
Rüti, Zürich